Guru Paarvai is a 1998 Indian Tamil language thriller film written and directed by Manoj Kumar. The film stars Prakash Raj, Khushbu and Anju Aravind, while Thalaivasal Vijay, Manivannan, Easwari Rao and Ramesh Khanna play the supporting roles. It was released on 13 November 1998. The film was dubbed in Hindi as Naya Natwarlal and was remade in Telugu as Veedu Samanyudu Kadhu with Prakash Raj reprising his role from the original, and in Hindi as Bhairav with Mithun Chakraborty.

Plot

The film begins with Guru Moorthi (Prakash Raj) who follows Pooja (Easwari Rao) like a mental. Guru Moorthi claims to be Mahendra Boopathi in his past life and he was in love with Alamelu. According to him, Pooja looks like his lover Alamelu and Guru Moorthi finally seduces her. They decide to get married but the day before their wedding, he foists prostitution charges on her and she is arrested. Guru Moorthi, in fact, is a mechanic living in both Vishakhapatnam and Chennai. Shanti (Khushbu), a petty thief, steals money to bring up her two nephews. She befriends Guru Moorthi and he accommodates her in his house. They both fall in love and Shanti is renamed Sonali by Guru Moorthi. They get married at the register office and Shanti signs under the name Sonali. One day, Guru Moorthi cancels the wedding of a woman named Sonali (Madhu Sharma) and he claims to be her husband, to prove it, he shows his marriage certificate. His wife Shanti doesn't understand why he behaves like a sadist and she was ready to leave him. Guru Moorthi ultimately tells her about his bitter past.

In the past, Mahendra Boopathi, despite being a young gold-medalist graduate, was unable to find a work. He lived with his mother, his sister Kalyani and his maternal uncle Nagarajan (Manivannan). His neighbour Priya (Anju Aravind) fell in love with him and she decided to live in his house without getting married. Boopathi had a chance to get a job in a bank if he passed an exam. On the day of the exam, he inadvertently lost his hall-ticket. In the meantime, Pooja, Sonali and Indhu (Indhu) were attacked by the rowdy Kaali (Thalaivasal Vijay) and they killed his younger brother accidentally. The police pressured them to tell the truth, they then found Boopathi's hall-ticket at the crime scene and they blamed him for killing Kaali's younger brother. Guru Moorthi was immediately arrested. Later, Kaali's elder brother Vijay (Thalaivasal Vijay) killed Guru Moorthi's entire family and his lover Priya. Guru Moorthi was sent in jail for seven years and Kaali fled to Ooty. Kaali changed his appearance, his name and he became a successful businessman. Hence, only Guru Moorthi and his uncle Nagarajan were the people to survive the attack on his family.

Back to the present, Shanti feels sorry for her innocent husband and decides to help him in seeking his revenge and calming himself. Guru Moorthi thus now searches for Kaali and Indhu. Kaali is now married to Indhu and they have a girl. In the end, Guru Moorthi tricks Indhu into shooting Kaali to death for which she gets arrested and Guru ends up adopting Indhu's daughter as his own.

Cast

Prakash Raj as Guru Moorthi alias Mahendra Boopathi
Khushbu as Shanthi, Mahendra's wife
Anju Aravind as Priya, Guru Moorthi's deceased lover 
Easwari Rao as Pooja 
Madhu Sharma as Sonali
Indhu as Indhu
Thalaivasal Vijay as Kaali alias Vijay, the main antagonist 
Manivannan as Nagarajan, Guru Moorthi's maternal uncle
Santhana Bharathi as Priya's father
Mohan V. Ram as Pooja's father
Baby Akshaya as Akshaya
Ramesh Khanna as Lingam
Alex as Joseph
Pandu as Vignesh
Singamuthu as a tea vendor
T. P. Gajendran as a comic inspector 
Sriman in a guest appearance
S. Ve. Shekher in a guest appearance

Soundtrack

The film score and the soundtrack were composed by Deva. The soundtrack, released in 1998, features 6 tracks with lyrics written by Vaali, R. V. Udayakumar, Arivumathi and Vaasan.

Reception
Indolink wrote "A suspense filled story-line keeps the viewers guessing about the motives of the vengeful hero, played to perfection by Prakashraj". BBthots wrote "An entertaining crime-thriller elevating Prakash Raj to the ranks of hero." Deccan Herald wrote "All in all, a bad film that drags and leaves you with a heavy feeling."

References

1998 films
Indian thriller films
1998 thriller films
Tamil films remade in other languages
Films scored by Deva (composer)
1990s Tamil-language films
Indian films about revenge